Joseph Kelshall (22 June 1887 – 15 May 1966) was a Trinidadian cricketer. He played in two first-class matches for Trinidad and Tobago in 1911/12 and 1919/20.

See also
 List of Trinidadian representative cricketers

References

External links
 

1887 births
1966 deaths
Trinidad and Tobago cricketers